Dolan may refer to:

People
 Dolan (surname), a surname
 Dolan people, Xinjiang, China
 The Dolans, an American husband and wife who hosted financial advice shows on radio and television

Places in the United States
 Dolan, Indiana
 Dolan Springs, Arizona
 Dolan Township, Cass County, Missouri

Fiction
 Ellen Dolan (comics), a character from The Spirit, created by Will Eisner
 Dolan (bioship), living spaceships in the Perry Rhodan fictional universe

Other uses
 Dolan Bikes, a British bicycle manufacturer
 Dolan Fire, a 2020 California wildfire
 Dolan Peak, a rock peak in the Quartz Hills, Antarctica
 Dolan v. City of Tigard, a Supreme Court case in the United States
 Dolans, a music venue and pub in Limerick, Ireland
 Dolan, trade name of Orphenadrine

See also
 Doolan, a surname
 Dolen (disambiguation)
 Dolin (disambiguation)